Compsoptera opacaria is a moth of the family Geometridae. It is found in south-western Europe, including Spain, Portugal, France and Italy.

The wingspan is 34–45 mm. Adults are on wing from August to October in one generation per year.

The larvae feed on the leaves of various plants, including Genista, Thymus, Juniperus  and Calluna vulgaris.

References

External links

Moths and Butterflies of Europe and North Africa
biodiversidadvirtual.org
Lot moths
Lepiforum.de

Moths described in 1819
Ennominae
Moths of Europe
Taxa named by Jacob Hübner